Critique of Anthropology is a quarterly peer-reviewed academic journal covering anthropology. It was established in 1974 and is published by SAGE Publications. The editors-in-chief are John Gledhill (University of Manchester) and Stephen Nugent (Goldsmiths College).

Abstracting and indexing 
Critique of Anthropology is abstracted and indexed in Scopus and the Social Sciences Citation Index. According to the Journal Citation Reports, the journal has a 2019 impact factor of 1.333.

References

External links
 

Anthropology journals
SAGE Publishing academic journals
Publications established in 2000
English-language journals
Quarterly journals